Java Analysis Studio (JAS) is an object oriented  data analysis package developed for the analysis of particle physics data. The latest major version is JAS3.

JAS3 is a fully AIDA-compliant data analysis system. It is popular for data analysis in areas of particle physics which are familiar with the Java programming language.

The Studio uses many other libraries from the FreeHEP project.

External links 
 
 Java Analysis Studio 3 website
 AIDA: Abstract Interfaces for Data Analysis — open interfaces and formats for particle physics data processing

Data analysis software
Experimental particle physics
Free software programmed in Java (programming language)
Free statistical software
Numerical software
Physics software